As the Old Sing, So the Young Pipe is a 1638–1640 painting by Jacob Jordaens, now in the musée des beaux-arts de Valenciennes. It shows three children playing the flute for a drinking party attended by three toothless old men.

References

Musical instruments in art
Paintings of children
Paintings by Jacob Jordaens
1638 paintings
1639 paintings
1640 paintings
Paintings in the collection of the Musée des Beaux-Arts de Valenciennes